Vicenta Jerónimo Jiménez (born 27 October 1972) is a Guatemalan indigenous human rights defender and politician, from Movement for the Liberation of Peoples. She has been a member of Congress since January 2020.

References 

1972 births
Living people
21st-century Guatemalan politicians
21st-century Guatemalan women politicians
Guatemalan women activists
Guatemalan Maya people
Guatemalan indigenous rights activists
Women human rights activists
People from Huehuetenango Department
Members of the Congress of Guatemala
Movement for the Liberation of Peoples politicians